Jean Henri Desmercières (8 May 1687 – 8 March 1778) was a French-Danish merchant, banker and major landowner in Holstein where he reclaimed large areas along the North Sea coast.

Early life
Born in Paris, Desmercières was the illegitimate son of Jean Henri Huguetan by a woman in the fashion industry. He was named for the fashion street Rue des Merciers. He was apprenticed to his father's trading house in Paris and later led its office in London.  He then moved to Berlin where he became a chamberlain for Frederick William I of Prussia.

Career in Denmark
In 1736, Desmercières moved to Copenhagen where his father had arranged for him to become a member of the Kammerkollegiet. He was responsible for issues related to fishing from 1753 but was apart from that mainly engaged in banking and trade. He remained a member of Kammerkollegiet until 1768 and from January through March 1767 served as its president. He was involved in the establishment of Kurantbanken, was a major stakeholder in the Danish Asiatic Company and the first director of the Danish Africa Company which was founded in 1755.

He belonged to Count Johann Hartwig Ernst von Bernstorff's social circle but was apparently not held in very high regard by him. It is believed that Desmercières was critical to Bernstorff's policy of subsidizing industrial enterprises.

Holdings in Holstein

Desmercières was a major landowner in Holstein. He owned Quarnbek as well as Emkendorf from 1743 to 1764.

He was a pioneer in land reclamation in the Holstein area where he reclaimed the bay at Bredstedt. The new area was named Desmerciereskoog after him (koog meaning 'polder'). Another reclaimed area was named Elisabeth-Sophien-Koog after his wife. The work was continued by Heinrich XLIII, Count Reuss of Ebersdorf, a nephew of Desmercières' half sister Marguerite Huguetan, Countess Gyldensteen. A memorial to Desmercières was unveiled in the area in 2004.

Personal life
Being an illegitimate son, Desmercières neither inherited his father's titles nor the Countship of Gyldensteen at the event of his death in 1749. He did, however, receive his town mansion in Bredgade (now Hotel Phoenix Copenhagen) as well as the country house Tusenborg at Kongens Lyngby. Desmercières was an active member of the French Reformed congregation in Copenhagen and supported it in several ways.

He married Elisabeth Sophie Frijs at Frijsenborg on 25 June 1751. She was the daughter of General-Lieutenant Count Christian Friis (1691–1763) and Countess Øllegaard Gersdorff (1687–1734). She became the holder of the countship of Frijsenborg upon the death of her sister Christine Sophie Friis in 1787.

He was appointed Konferensråd in 1727 and Gehejmeråd in 1745. He was created Knight of the Order of the Elephant in 1768 and  Gehejmekonferensråd in 1775. On 22 February 1886, he was naturalized and ennobled by letters patent. Having no sons, the Desmercières noble family died with him just two years later. He is buried at Church of St. George and Mauritius in Flemhude, part of Quarnbek.

References

1687 births
1778 deaths
18th-century Danish businesspeople
Danish bankers
Danish merchants
French emigrants to Denmark
Naturalised citizens of Denmark